Wien Hernals is a railway station serving Hernals, the seventeenth district of Vienna.

References 

Railway stations in Vienna
Austrian Federal Railways
Hernals